The Ambassador of the United Kingdom to Tunisia is the United Kingdom's foremost diplomatic representative to the Republic of Tunisia, and head of the UK's diplomatic mission in Tunis.

Ambassadors
1956–1960: Angus Malcolm
1960–1963: Anthony Lambert
1963–1966: Sir Herbert Marchant
1966–1967: Robin Hooper
1968–1970: Edward Warner
1970–1973: Archibald Mackenzie
1973–1975: John Marnham
1975–1977: Glencairn Balfour Paul
1977–1981: Sir John Lambert
1981–1984: Sir Alexander Stirling
1984–1987: Sir James Adams
1987–1992: Stephen Day
1992–1995: Michael Tait
1995–1999: Richard Edis
1999–2002: Ivor Rawlinson
2002–2004: Robin Kealy
2004–2008: Alan Goulty
2008–2013: Chris O'Connor
2013–2016: Hamish Cowell

2016–2020: Louise De Sousa
2021-: Helen Winterton

References
General

Specific

External links
UK and Tunisia, gov.uk
British Embassy Tunis on Facebook

 
Tunisia
United Kingdom